Nangō-Jūsan-Chōme Station (南郷13丁目駅) is a Sapporo Municipal Subway station in Shiroishi-ku, Sapporo, Hokkaido, Japan. The station number is T15.

Platforms
The station has two side platforms serving two tracks on the second basement level.

Surrounding area
 Japan National Route 12 (to Asahikawa)
 Shiraishi Shrine
 Shiroishi Nango Post Office
 Keiyukai Sapporo Hospital
 Tokou Store, Nango Jūsan-Chome branch
 Tsutaya Store, Nango Jūsan-Chome branch
 Royal Host, Nango branch
 Hokuriku Bank,  Shiraishi branch

Gallery

External links

 Sapporo Subway Stations

Railway stations in Japan opened in 1982
Railway stations in Sapporo
Sapporo Municipal Subway